Čechůvky is a small village, one of the administrative parts of Prostějov in the Czech Republic. It has population of 163.

History 
In Čechůvky, there is the Chapel of Saint Ottilia, which was built in 1722. During the Austro-Prussian War in 1866, a battle between Prussian and Saxon troops took place there. On the place, a little cross was built to commemorate the event.

Between 1960-1973 Čechůvky was a part of Vrahovice. In 1973 both villages became parts of Prostějov.

References

Literature 
 Bartková, Hana; Dolák, Karel; Lužný, Jan. Historie Čechůvek a kaplička sv. Otýlie. Prostějov 2007. 
 Bartková, Hana. Kříž u Čechůvek: neznámý mecenáš přežil válečnou řež. Prostějovský týden, 2008, 18(37), p. 4. Prostějovský deník, 2008, 213. 
 Faktor, František: Popis okresního hejtmanství prostějovského. Praha 1898, pp. 60–61. 
 Wolny, Gregor: Die Markgraftschaft Mähren, topographisch, statistisch und historisch geschildert. V. Band. Olmützer Kreis. Brno 1839, pp. 682–683. 

Neighbourhoods in the Czech Republic
Prostějov
Villages in Prostějov District